The Butler House is a historic mansion in Mountain City, Tennessee, U.S.. It was built for Congressman Roderick R. Butler circa 1871, and designed in the Italianate architectural style. It has been listed on the National Register of Historic Places since April 11, 1973.

References

Houses on the National Register of Historic Places in Tennessee
Italianate architecture in Tennessee
Houses completed in 1871
Mountain City, Tennessee
National Register of Historic Places in Johnson County, Tennessee